Patricia Smith may refer to:
 Patricia Smith (bowls) (1920–2017), Australian lawn bowler
 Patricia Smith (poet) (born 1955), American poet and writer
 Tricia Smith (born 1957), Canadian rower and lawyer
 Patricia Smith, Viscountess Hambleden (1904–1994), Lady of the Bedchamber to Queen Elizabeth
 Patricia Anne Smith (born 1943), former politician in Saskatchewan, Canada
 Patricia Haynes Smith (born 1946), member of the Louisiana House of Representatives
 Patricia Hornsby-Smith, Baroness Hornsby-Smith (1914–1985), British politician
 Patricia Spafford Smith (1925–2002), American businesswoman and politician
 M. Patricia Smith (born circa 1952), American labor lawyer and government official
 Patricia Smith (actress) (1930–2011), movie and television actress
 Patricia Southall (born 1971), later Smith, founder and spokesperson of Treasure You

See also
 Patti Grace Smith (1947–2016), United States Federal Aviation Administration (FAA) official
 Patti Smith (born 1946), American singer-songwriter and poet
 Patti Smith (politician) (1946–2017), politician in Oregon
 Patty Smyth (born 1957), American singer and songwriter, leader of the rock band Scandal
 Patty Hill (Patty Smith Hill, 1868–1946), American educator
 Pat Smith (disambiguation)